The University of Hohenheim is a campus university located in the south of Stuttgart, Germany. Founded in 1818, it is Stuttgart's oldest university. Its primary areas of specialisation had traditionally been agricultural and natural sciences. Today, however, the majority of its students are enrolled in one of the many study programs offered by the faculty of business, economics and social sciences. The faculty has regularly been ranked among the best in the country, making the University of Hohenheim one of Germany's top-tier universities in these fields. The university maintains academic alliances with a number of partner universities and is involved in numerous joint research projects.

History
From 1770 to 1794, the Karlsschule was the only university in Stuttgart. Since its founding in 1818, Stuttgart's oldest university has been the University of Hohenheim. The eruption of the Indonesian volcano Mount Tambora in 1815 triggered a global climate change and was one of the causes of the massive famine suffered in the Kingdom of Württemberg at the beginning of the 19th century. In 1818 King William I of Württemberg set up an Agricultural Academy in Hohenheim to radically improve general nutrition in the kingdom through teaching, experimentation and demonstration and, in so doing, laid the foundation for the University of Hohenheim. At that time, there were 18 students enrolled and a staff of three professors. It is not connected to or affiliated with the University of Stuttgart (founded in 1829), although there is collaboration between the two.

The first director of the academy was Johann Nepomuk Schwerz, and it was located in Hohenheim Palace, built by Charles Eugene, Duke of Württemberg.

In 1847 the institution was designated as holding the rank of an "Academy of Agriculture and Forestry". In 1904 the name was changed to "Agricultural College". Hohenheim College was awarded the right to confer doctorates in 1918 and habilitations in 1919. With the appointment of Margarete von Wrangell to the chair for plant nutrition in 1923, she became the first female full professor at a German university. During the period of national socialism, the university was brought into line with the party's ideology, and it was forced to close in 1945.

Architecturally, the university that re-opened its doors in 1946 had survived World War II relatively undamaged. In 1964 the faculties of Agricultural Sciences and Natural Sciences were created, followed in 1968 by the Faculty of Business, Economics and Social Sciences. Hohenheim has enjoyed university status since 1967 when it became known as Universität Hohenheim.

Today there are approximately 9,000 students and a teaching staff of around 900, of which slightly more than 100 are professors. Over 2,000 people now work at the university. The current rector of the university is the agricultural economist Stephan Dabbert (born 23 June 1958), who took office on 1 April 2012.

Location

The University of Hohenheim is located in southwest Germany, in the district of Plieningen on the southern rim of Baden in Württemberg's capital, Stuttgart. It was named the most beautiful campus university in Baden-Württemberg in 2009 and is generally acknowledged as having one of the most picturesque campuses in the country. The baroque palace, the University's emblem and its main building, is surrounded by the historic parklands and botanical Hohenheim Gardens including the historic Landesarboretum Baden-Württemberg.
The campus is close to the light rail line U3 station Plieningen Garbe (Stuttgart Stadtbahn) and is within minutes of the Stuttgart airport, Stuttgart Exhibition Center and major motorways.

Research

The university currently pursues research in the fields of health, nutrition, agriculture, consumer protection and environmental protection, as well as economics and communication.

Areas of particular importance include:

 Agricultural and nutritional sciences within the food chain
 Biobased products and bioenergy from agriculture
 Biological signals
 Bioeffector research Biofector
 Innovation and services

University networks
The university is active in academic alliances and is a member of both the ELLS and the HERMES university networks.

ELLS
The University of Hohenheim was co-founder of the Euroleague for Life Sciences (ELLS) which was established in 2001. This university life sciences network presently includes the following members:

 University of Hohenheim (UHOH), Stuttgart, Germany
 University of Copenhagen Faculty of Science (KU), Copenhagen, Denmark
 Swedish University of Agricultural Sciences (SLU), Uppsala, Sweden
 University of Natural Resources and Applied Life Sciences Vienna (BOKU), Austria
 Wageningen University and Research Centre (WUR), the Netherlands
 Czech University of Life Sciences Prague (CULS), Czech Republic and
 Warsaw University of Life Science (SGGW), Poland.
 University of Kassel, Kassel, Germany.
 Szent István University, Gödöllö, Hungary

Main fields of co-operation in ELLS are:

 joint curriculum development
 student and staff mobility
 pooling of expertise
 quality assurance
 development of university policy and strategy
 internationalization

HERMES
The HERMES (Higher Education and Research in Management of European UniversitieS) network is a strategic alliance of 18 leading European universities in 11 countries. Its goal is to offer dual degree programs in Management on all academic levels: Bachelor's, Master's and Doctoral studies.

The participating universities work closely together in defining their study programs, exchanging professors and organizing joint research projects. Each year, this network holds an annual conference at one of the partner universities, where common programs are defined and achievements are reported.

Scientific Centers of the University
 Life Science Center
 Eastern Europe Center (EEC)
 Center for Bioenergy and Biobased Products
 Competence Center for Plant Breeding
 Center for Agriculture in the Tropics and Subtropics
 Food Security Center
 Center for Research on Innovation and Services
 Competence Center Gender and Nutrition

Museums
The university's museums are open to the general public. Visitors can take a tour through the history of agriculture in the German Agricultural Museum, which encompasses 5,700 sq.m. of covered exhibition space. The Zoological and Veterinary Museum has a collection of teaching aids and curiosities on display in a traditional exhibition in the palace. Set in the Exotic Garden of the university, the Hohenheim History Museum in the Spielhaus tells the history of the municipality, the palace and the university.

Special characteristics
 The University of Hohenheim has been accredited as being a family-oriented university since 2004.
 The university possesses its own cemetery, where professors were buried a long time ago. Today it is used very rarely.
 According to a survey conducted to elect the most beautiful campus in Germany, the university could reach the 7th place in the overall placings in 2009. Therefore, it is seen as one of the most beautiful campuses in Baden-Württemberg.
 The university hosts the Josef G. Knoll Visiting Professorship for Development Studies, a chair endowed by Senator Herman Eiselen. The first holder, Prof. Dr. Patrick Webb, established a programme of teaching and research from 1996 through 1998. He was succeeded by Prof. Dr. Dieter Neubert (1999/2000), Prof. Dr. Heinz-Rüdiger Korff (2000–2004), and PD Dr. Thomas Berger (2004–2007).

Notable professors and alumni
 Enno Bahrs (born 1967), is an agricultural scientist and economist, and tax expert, at the University
 Dietrich Büsselberg (born 1957), is a physiologist, academic, and author. He is an Associate Dean and Professor of Physiology and Biophysics at Weill Cornell Medicine–Qatar.
 Stephan Dabbert (born 1958), German agricultural economist and Rector of the University
 Werner Doppler (born 1941), German agricultural and economical 
 Günther Franz (1902-1992), German agricultural historian, Rector of the University from 1963 to 1967
 Ruediger Heining (born 1968), German agricultural scientist and economist
 Wilhelm Hertenstein (1825–1888), Swiss politician and President of the Confederation 1888
 Winfried Kretschmann (born 1948), German politician of the Green Party of Germany, Minister-President of the state of Baden-Württemberg since 2011
 Abdul Ghafar Lakanwal, Afghan cabinet minister
  Hans-Peter Liebig (1945), German agricultural scientist and Rektor of the University 2002–2012
 Uwe Ludewig (born 1967), German agricultural scientist and Director of the Institute of Crop Science Hohenheim
 Stefan Mappus (born 1966), German politician from the Christian Democratic Union (CDU). He was Minister President of the state of Baden-Württemberg 2010–2011
 Torsten Müller (born 1962), German agricultural scientist and Dean of Education of the Agricultural Science Faculty in Hohenheim
 Guenter Neumann (born 1958), German plant physiologist and scientific coordinator of the EU Research Project Biofector
 Manfred G. Raupp (born 1941), German agricultural and economical scientist
 Volker Roemheld (1941–2013), German agricultural scientist, plant physiologist and soil biologist at Hohenheim University
 Wilhelm Conrad Roentgen (1845–1923), German physicist, discoverer of X-rays
 Satyabrata Sarkar (born 1928), Indian virologist
 Jürgen Stark (born 1948), German economist and prior chief economist of the European Central Bank
 Ralf T. Voegele (born 1963), German biologist and Dean of the Agricultural Science Faculty in Hohenheim
 F. Wolfgang Schnell (1913–2006), German professor of applied genetics and plant breeding
 Markus Weinmann (* 1974), German agricultural scientist in the area of Plant Physiology 
 Margarete von Wrangell (1877–1932), Baltic German agricultural chemist and the first female full professor at a German university
 Juergen Zeddies (born 1942), is a German agricultural economist and Emeritus of the University

References

External links
  

 
1818 establishments in Germany
Agricultural universities and colleges in Germany
Educational institutions established in 1818
Universities and colleges in Baden-Württemberg